Smilax maritima is a North American species of plants native to the south-eastern United States from Texas to North Carolina.

Smilax maritima is a branching vine up to 150 cm (60 inches) tall. Berries are black with a waxy coating.

References

External links
Lady Bird Johnson Wildflower Center, University of Texas, Smilax smallii Morong Lanceleaf greenbrier, Southern smilax, Jacksonvine, Jacksonbrier
University of Texas, Biology Courses, Smilax smallii  Common Name:  Small's Greenbrier
Southeastern Flora, Smilax smallii

Smilacaceae
Flora of the United States
Plants described in 1861